Pauspur is a village in the state of Assam in India, located to the south of the Mornai Tea Estate within Kokrajhar district. It had its own Lutheran congregation and church, Pauspur Church, which was closed in 1951.

History

It was built just outside Mornai Tea Estate at the colony's southern border in the late 19th century by missionaries affiliated with the Santal Mission of the Northern Churches. The village of Pauspur is mentioned as early as 1896. The village was named in honour of Bernhard Pauss (whose last name is also spelled Paus), the chairman of the Norwegian Santal Mission, and thus consists of the Norwegian family name Paus and the Sanskrit suffix pur, meaning "city" or "settlement." The village's name was usually spelled Pauspur, although its namesake Bernhard Pauss used a different spelling of his last name.

A map including the village's location is included in the book Santalmisjonens historie.

The village had its own Bengali-language Protestant church. The Bengali-speaking Christians of the colony lived mainly in Pauspur or Bijoepur. In 1919 services were held in a buffalo stable in Pauspur. In 1921 the journal Santalen mentioned a small church in Pauspur. A new church in Pauspur was completed in 1939. However, in 1951, Pauspur church was closed and religious services were moved to a newly completed church in Dingdinga.

Pauspur is located around 40 kilometres to the south of Bhutan and around 25 kilometres to the north of Bangladesh.

References

Villages in Kokrajhar district